Brigadier Robert Andrew Wyman, CBE, DSO, ED was a Canadian Army officer. He was the commanding officer of the 1st Canadian Armoured Brigade from 1942 to 1944.

References 

 https://generals.dk/general/Wyman/Robert_Andrew/Canada.html
 https://www.blatherwick.net/documents/General%20%26%20Flag%20Officers%20WWI%20and%20WWII/03%20World%20War%20II%20Canadian%20Generals.pdf

Year of birth missing
Year of death missing
Canadian Army officers
Canadian Army personnel of World War II
Canadian Commanders of the Order of the British Empire
Canadian Companions of the Distinguished Service Order